Pode is a co-operative puzzler by Norwegian indie developer Henchman & Goon. It was released for the Nintendo Switch on June 21, 2018 and for the PlayStation 4 on February 19, 2019. The game was also released for Microsoft Windows on April 3, 2020. The game's story centers around a rock trying to help a fallen star work its way back home.

Reception

Accolades
The game was nominated for "Original Score" at the 9th Hollywood Music in Media Awards, and for "Best Original Soundtrack Album" at the 2019 G.A.N.G. Awards.

References

External links
 Homepage
 Nintendo.com page

2018 video games
Cooperative video games
Multiplayer and single-player video games
Nintendo Switch games
PlayStation 4 games
Puzzle video games
Video games developed in Norway
Video games scored by Austin Wintory
Windows games